Jackson family may refer to:

People
 Jackson family, - an American family of singers
 Rebbie Jackson (born 1950)
 Michael Jackson (1958–2009)
 Jackie Jackson (born 1951)
 Tito Jackson (born 1953)
 Jermaine Jackson (born 1954)
 La Toya Jackson (born 1956)
 Marlon Jackson (born 1957)
 Randy Jackson (The Jacksons) (born 1961)
 Janet Jackson (born 1966)

Bands
 3T an American R&B/pop music group
 The Jackson 5, an American popular family music group